Acronia perelegans is a species of beetle in the family Cerambycidae. It was described by Westwood in 1863. It is known from the Philippines.

References

Acronia
Beetles described in 1863